Cephaloleia presignis is a species of rolled-leaf beetle in the family Chrysomelidae, first found in Mexico.

References

Further reading
Arreguín‐Espinosa, Roberto, Barbarín Arreguín, and Carolina González. "Purification and properties of a lipase from Cephaloleia presignis (Coleoptera, Chrysomelidae)." Biotechnology and applied biochemistry 31.3 (2000): 239–244. 
Zouari, Nacim, et al. "Scorpion digestive lipase: a member of a new invertebrate's lipase group presenting novel characteristics." Biochimie 89.3 (2007): 403–409.

External links

Cassidinae
Insects of Mexico